Tubongu is one of the 54 parish councils in Cangas del Narcea, a municipality within the province and autonomous community of Asturias, in northern Spain.

Its villages include: Antráu, Xavita, Portieḷḷa, El Puelu, Pontelinfiernu, Robléu Biforcu and Tubongu.

References

Parishes in Cangas del Narcea